Walkerana muduga, also known as the Muduga mountain leaping frog or Muduga leaping frog, is a species of frog in the family Ranixalidae. It is endemic to the Western Ghats of India and known from the Elivai Malai range, north of the Palghat Gap in Tamil Nadu. All other known species of Walkerana occur south of the Palghat Gap, and molecular data suggest that Walkerana muduga is deeply divergent from the more southern species. However, there is another, as yet undescribed lineage from north of the Palghat Gap that is known from a single, poorly preserve specimen.

Etymology
Walkerana muduga is named after the Mudugar indigenous community of Palghat district, Kerala.

Description
Two male specimens measure  in snout–vent length, whereas an adult female specimen is much larger,  in SVL. The body is squat and raised. The snout is bluntly pointed. The tympanum is distinct but partly concealed by the supratympanic fold. The finger and the toe tips have truncated, enlarged discs. The fingers have no webbing while the toes have reduced webbing. Skin is dorsally smooth, but there are some small, longitudinal glandular skin folds. The dorsum is light fleshy brown. The bases of the raised folds are dark brown. The inter-orbital space has light brown blotches. The lower lip is barred. A dark brown streak runs from the tip of snout till the end of the supratympanic fold. The flanks are uniform light brown without any markings. The limbs are barred. The region of throat is yellowish brown while the belly is whitish grey.

Habitat and conservation
Dinesh and colleagues report having observed multiple populations of Walkerana north of the Palghat Gap, but give no ecological information. As of early 2020, this newly described species had not been included in the IUCN Red List. General threats in the area include deforestation, forest degradation, and climate change.

Notes

References

muduga
Frogs of India
Endemic fauna of the Western Ghats
Amphibians described in 2020